Polygonum undulatum is a species of flowering plant in the family Polygonaceae, native to the Cape Provinces of South Africa. It was first described by Carl Linnaeus in 1753 as Atraphaxis undulata, and later transferred to Polygonum by Peter Jonas Bergius.

References

undulatum
Flora of the Cape Provinces